Korobeynikovo is a rural locality (a selo) and the administrative center of Korobeynikovsky Selsoviet, Ust-Pristansky District, Altai Krai, Russia. The population was 1,060 in 2016. There are 24 streets.

Geography 
Korobeynikovo is located on the on highway Aleysk - Petropavlovskoe - Biysk, 44 km south of Ust-Charyshskaya Pristan (the district's administrative centre) by road. Nizhneozernoye is the nearest rural locality.

References 

Rural localities in Ust-Pristansky District